The Roman Catholic Church in Burma is composed of 3 ecclesiastical provinces, each with an archdiocese headed by an archbishop, and a total of 13 dioceses headed by bishops.

Episcopal Conference of Burma

Ecclesiastical Province of Mandalay
Archdiocese of Mandalay 
Diocese of Banmaw
Diocese of Hakha
Diocese of Kalay
Diocese of Lashio
Diocese of Myitkyina

Ecclesiastical Province of Taunggyi
Archdiocese of Taunggyi
Diocese of Kengtung
Diocese of Loikaw
Diocese of Pekhon
Diocese of Taungngu

Ecclesiastical Province of Yangon
Archdiocese of Yangon 
Diocese of Hpa-an
Diocese of Mawlamyine 
Diocese of Pathein
Diocese of Pyay

External links 
Catholic-Hierarchy entry.
GCatholic.org.

Myanmar
Catholic dioceses